Fievel's American Tails is an animated television series, produced by Amblimation, Nelvana, and Universal Cartoon Studios. It aired on CBS for one season in 1992, and continued Fievel's adventures from the film An American Tail: Fievel Goes West. Phillip Glasser, Dom DeLuise and Cathy Cavadini were the only actors from the film to reprise their roles, as Fievel, Tiger and Tanya respectively. One character, Wylie Burp, is written off from this show following the respect of James Stewart's retirement. Another character, Tony Toponi, is written off following Pat Musick's then-current parenting of her daughter Mae Whitman, as Tony could not reappear until the DTV sequels in the late 1990s. He only made cameos in Fievel Goes West owing to that respect.

The show had a focus on promoting reading, and frequently the solution to an episode's conflict was found by Fievel reading. The character also appeared in public-service messages sponsored by the nonprofit Reading Is Fundamental.

After its abandonment for over two decades, NBCUniversal regained rights to the series in 2020.

Characters 
 Fievel Mousekewitz: The main protagonist, a little mouse who is always looking for adventures.
 Tanya Mousekewitz: Fievel and Yasha's older sister who has dreams of being a great singer.
 Yasha Mousekewitz: Tanya and Fievel's baby sister.
 Papa Mousekewitz: Tanya, Fievel, and Yasha's father, a famous violin maker who always gives his Jewish Russian family wise advice. Papa's real name is Bernard and he is Aunt Sophie's older brother in "Aunt Sophie's Visit", which was wiped from the DTV sequels.
 Mama Mousekewitz: Tanya, Fievel, and Yasha's mother, a strict, practical, and realistic homemaker who tries to keep her family safe from Cat R. Waul, Chula, and Sweet William's gang.
 Tiger: The goofy cowardly Orange tabby cat who is Fievel's best friend. Tiger is a vegetarian who often eats fish. Tiger met Fievel and his family in An American Tail. He later moved out west to Green River, Utah with Fievel's family and his girlfriend Miss Kitty in An American Tail: Fievel Goes West.
 Cat R. Waul: The main antagonist, a gentleman-like cat who is Fievel's nemesis.
 T. R. Chula: Cat R. Waul's tarantula sidekick and a caricature of Butch Cassidy.
 Sweet William: An evil outlaw cat who is Fievel's other nemesis.
 Slim and Feloneous: Sweet William's two dim-witted alley cat sidekicks.
 Jack: One of Fievel's school mates from Australia.
 Jorge: Another one of Fievel's school mates.
 Mr. J. M. Schimmel: The prairie dog who owns the mouse-sized general store in Green River. He is also Sidney's father and is Austrian-American as revealed in "Law and Disorder".
 Clint Mousewood: One of Fievel's heroes and Tanya's one-sided crush – from "Mail Order Mayhem". A caricature of Clint Eastwood.
 Hambone: The dog guard on the train – from "The Gift".
 Sidney Schimmel: One of Fievel's more spoiled classmate. First appears in Law and Disorder. He is Mr. J. M. Schimmel's son.
 Sophie Mousekewitz: Tanya, Fievel, and Yasha's aunt from Russia. She visits the Mousekewitzs from "Aunt Sophie's Visit". She is also Papa's younger sister and Mama's sister-in-law.
 Dr. Travis T. Hiprocates: A traveling doctor that gave away hiccup sweets – from "A Case of the Hiccups". A caricature of Sigmond Freud.
 Miss Kitty: Tiger's girlfriend from "Law and Disorder". A caricature of Dorothy Gibson.
 Mr. Ironside: The school teacher, probably a mole and British-American as revealed in "The Legend of Mouse Hollow".
 Dog: The dog who guards the jail house.
 Lorna Holcombe: A girl in Fievel's class – from "A Case of the Hiccups".
 Patty Paris: The baker. A caricature of Ona Munson's Belle Watling from Gone with the Wind.

Cast 
 Phillip Glasser as Fievel
 Dom DeLuise as Tiger
 Lloyd Battista as Papa, originally voiced by Nehemiah Persoff
 Susan Silo as Mama, originally voiced by Erica Yohn
 Cathy Cavadini as Tanya and Yasha
 Dan Castellaneta as T. R. Chula, Mr. Schimmel, Slim and Felonious. T.R. Chula was voiced by Jon Lovitz in the original film role
 Gerrit Graham as Cat R. Waul. John Cleese was briefly considered to reprise his role as Cat R. Waul from the film but Graham took over the role.
 Kenneth Mars as Sweet William
 Hal Rayle as Clint Mousewood
 Arthur Burghardt as Hambone
 Cynthia Ferrer as Miss Kitty, originally voiced by Amy Irving
 Patricia Parris as Aunt Sophie
 Carlos Carrasco as Jorge
 Alex Dent as Fernando
 Danny Mann as Dog
 Lisa Picotte as Lorna Holcomb
 Paige Gosney as Sidney
 Roland Thomson as Jack

Episodes

Home media 
In 1993 and 1994, MCA/Universal Home Video released twelve episodes on six VHS video-cassettes, two Laserdisc volumes. These have been the only home video releases of the cartoon, at least in the United States. In the United Kingdom, 12 episodes were released on six video-cassettes in 1995, but were in a different episode order to the United States and Vol. 4 features the only episode that hasn't been released in the United States. Episodes have been released on DVD in France, Germany, and Italy. In 2020, NBCUniversal regained the long-abandoned series and streamed it on Peacock.

References

External links 
 
 Fievel's American Tails on Big Cartoon Database

1990s American animated television series
1990s Canadian animated television series
1992 American television series debuts
1992 American television series endings
1992 Canadian television series debuts
1992 Canadian television series endings
American children's animated adventure television series
American children's animated comedy television series
American children's animated fantasy television series
American sequel television series
Western (genre) animated television series
Canadian children's animated adventure television series
Canadian children's animated comedy television series
Canadian children's animated fantasy television series
CBS original programming
Television series by Nelvana
Animated television shows based on films
Television series by Universal Television
Universal Pictures cartoons and characters
English-language television shows
Television series by Amblin Entertainment
Television series by Universal Animation Studios
An American Tail (franchise)
1990s Western (genre) television series
NBCUniversal
Animated television series about children
Animated television series about mice and rats